The El Paso BOTA Port of Entry, located at the Bridge of the Americas (BOTA), connecting Mexican Federal Highway 45 to the south and Interstate 110 to the north, is El Paso's highest volume border crossing, carrying more than half the vehicles (trucks and passenger cars) entering El Paso, Texas from Mexico.  This is due in large part to the fact that BOTA is the only bridge in between Mexico and Texas that does not charge a toll.  It is a "Class A" service port with a full range of cargo processing functions, and it is open for passenger vehicle traffic 24/7.  It is open for commercial truck inspections 6:00 AM–6:00 PM Weekdays, 6:00 AM–2:00 PM Saturdays.

Construction on the BOTA crossing was completed in 1967 as part of the Chamizal Treaty between the US and Mexico signed in 1963 that involved a land exchange between the two countries.  The El Paso property where the US border inspection station at BOTA is located was Mexican land prior to the execution of this treaty.

References

See also

 List of Mexico–United States border crossings
 List of Canada–United States border crossings

Mexico–United States border crossings
Transportation in El Paso, Texas
1967 establishments in Texas
Buildings and structures in El Paso, Texas
Buildings and structures completed in 1967